Harðardóttir is an Icelandic patronymic surname, literally meaning "daughter of Hörður". It may refer to:

Eygló Harðardóttir (born 1972), Icelandic politician
Manuela Ósk Harðardóttir (born 1983), Icelandic beauty queen and model
Oddný Guðbjörg Harðardóttir (born 1957), Icelandic politician

Similr name for a son is Harðarson.

Icelandic-language surnames